Sphoeroides annulatus (bullseye puffer) is a species in the family Tetraodontidae, or pufferfishes. It is found in the eastern Pacific Ocean from California, USA to Pisco, Peru and the Galápagos Islands.

References

External links
 

Tetraodontidae
Fish described in 1842